The Merrimack Warriors women's basketball team represents Merrimack College in North Andover, Massachusetts, United States. The school's team currently competes in the Northeast Conference. They are currently led by first-year head coach Kelly Morrone and play their home games at the Merrimack Athletics Complex.

Postseason

NCAA Division II Tournament results

References

External links
Website

Women's basketball teams
Merrimack Warriors basketball